WUEC (89.7 FM) is a radio station licensed to Eau Claire, Wisconsin, United States. The station is part of Wisconsin Public Radio (WPR) and broadcasts WPR's "NPR News and Classical Network", consisting of classical music and news and talk programming. WUEC also broadcasts local news and programming from studios in the Wisconsin Public Broadcasting regional center in Eau Claire and studios in the Hibbard Humanities building at the University of Wisconsin-Eau Claire.

See also
 Wisconsin Public Radio

External links
Wisconsin Public Radio

UEC
Wisconsin Public Radio
Classical music radio stations in the United States
NPR member stations
Radio stations established in 1948